Renny Roker is a promoter and actor. As a promoter, he has been involved in both music and sport. He also ran various record labels with his brother Wally Roker in the 1970s. As an actor his career which really started in the 1960s has carried on through to the 2010s.

Background
Roker was born on September 6, 1942 in New York City, New York. He has lived in places as diverse as South Carolina, the Virgin Islands and Puerto Rico.  He had acting aspirations from the age of ten. He went to college in Puerto Rico ands majored in drama and speech. While he was in his teens he won a D.J. contest and that enabled him to work in that field through his junior and senior college years.

He was heavily involved in the promotional side of BMX racing and left it in the early 1980s but returned to it around 2010. He is also related to  Al Roker, and actress Roxie Roker.

In 2015, his book Positivity was published.

Film and television career
His earliest role was at the age of around fifteen. He landed a small recurring part in Recuerdos de Maria, a Puerto Rican soap opera where he played one of Maria's neighbors.

He played the part of Detective Galey in the 1999 film Kidnapped in Paradise which was directed by Rob Hedden.

Filmography

Music career
He ran Roker Records with his brother Wally. The label released singles from 1969 to 1971. It released singles by The Four Monitors, Irma Thomas, Swamp Dogg, The Whispers and Gloria Lynne. Around March 1970, he and his brother formed Canyon Records. It was reported in the December 5, 1970 issue of Billboard that due to the name conflicting with a similar company in Denver, they were changing it. At that time under their Roker Record Group, they operated the RRG, Roker, Soulclock and Stardom record labels.

In 1972, Roker and Swamp Dogg were set to appear on TV show Target, which was broadcast on WPVI-TV in Philadelphia. Their two appearances were connected to the release of the single "Sam Stone" which tells of the plight of a Vietnam Vet who returns home with a heavy drug habit. The single was released through Cream Records which Roker was connected with.

In the late 1970s he was president of R&B Productions, which was based in Los Angeles. Also in the late 1970s, he organized the First Funk Fest in Soldier Field, Chicago, an event that was attended by 70,000.

Sport
Roker co-founded Teens on the Green, an organization that originally started out addressing the issue of minority youngsters who were dropping out of the game. Also providing them access to the more prestigious golf venues. Some of the teens who have gone through the program have gone to play in other countries, in college and according to Roker, some have played in the LPGA.

References

External links
 Imdb: Renny Roker
 EURweb.com: Entertainment & Sports Trailblazer, Renny Roker Releases New Book ‘Positivity’

1942 births
African-American male actors
Male actors from New York City
American music industry executives
Living people
21st-century African-American people
20th-century African-American people